A tick is a parasitic mite of the order Ixodida.

Tick or ticking may also refer to:
Tick (check mark), a mark (✓, ✔, ☑, etc.) used to indicate 'yes', 'complete' or 'correct'
Ticking, cotton or linen textile tightly woven for durability

Arts and entertainment 

Tick (character), a spoof comicbook superhero created by Ben Edlund in 1986
The Tick (1994 TV series), an animated series on Fox
The Tick (2001 TV series), a live-action series on Fox
The Tick (2016 TV series), a 2016 series on Amazon Prime
The Tick (video game), a 1994 game based on the 1994 TV series
Ticks (film), a 1993 direct-to-video horror film
"Ticks" (song), a 2007 single by Brad Paisley
"Ticking", a song by Elton John from Caribou
"Tick", a song by Ween from GodWeenSatan: The Oneness

Computing 
 Tick, atomic unit used to define system time in computing
Tick (software), a time tracking software
 Tick, a delay of 1/18 seconds in IPX routing (IPX Rip) used instead of hop counting
 Tick, a computer instruction cycle, which is, in some operating systems, a unit countable by software
 Backtick, by which the character ` is sometimes known in computing

Other uses 
 Commodity tick, a unit of measurement of price movement of a stock or other exchange traded asset
Tick Segerblom (born 1948), an American attorney and politician
"The Tick", the Magellan Project Science Team's nickname for the first scalloped margin dome found on Venus
 Ticked, isolated regions of pigment in dog coat coloration patterns
 Ticked tabby, a coat pattern of tabby cat fur
Tick (pejorative), a pejorative used in Germany

See also
Tic (disambiguation)
Ticket (disambiguation)
Tik (disambiguation)
Tick tock (disambiguation)
Tick fever (disambiguation)